Willow (born January 3, 2020) is a tabby domestic short-haired cat owned by President Joe Biden and First Lady Jill Biden. Formerly a farm cat, she was adopted by the Biden family from Rick Telesz as part of a campaign promise to adopt a cat into the First Family and is named after Jill Biden's hometown of Willow Grove, Pennsylvania. Willow is the first cat to live in the White House since India, who was owned by President George W. Bush and First Lady Laura Bush.

Biography
Willow is a former farm cat that was born in Western Pennsylvania, and was formerly owned by Rick Telesz, a farmer in Volant, Lawrence County, Pennsylvania. She has green eyes.

Adoption
  
Jill Biden first met Willow during a campaign speech at the farm where she resided and she immediately bonded with her. In an interview Jill stated that the cat had, between then and her adoption by the Bidens, been living with a foster family, had grown attached to the cat. Rick Telesz, Willow's former owner, claimed that he received a phone call where he was informed that Jill wanted to adopt Willow from him.

Willow's adoption was part of a campaign promise to adopt a cat into the First Family, and after being so, was named Willow Biden, after Jill's hometown of Willow Grove, Pennsylvania.

While the adoption of a cat by the Biden family was promised in late 2020, Willow was only adopted in 2022 because of concerns that she would not get along with the Biden family's German Shepherd Major, who had biting issues. Eventually Major was sent to live with friends of the Biden family in Delaware.

See also
United States presidential pets
List of individual cats

References

External links

2020 animal births
Biden family
Joe Biden
United States presidential cats